Ian James Muir (born 5 May 1963) is an English former professional football striker who scored 146 goals from 330 appearances in the Football League playing for Queens Park Rangers, Burnley, Birmingham City, Brighton & Hove Albion, Swindon Town, Tranmere Rovers and Darlington. He also played in the Hong Kong First Division League for Sing Tao and Happy Valley, before returning to non-league football in England with Nuneaton Borough and Stratford Town. He is Tranmere's all-time record goalscorer, with 180 goals in all competitions.

Tranmere Rovers

Muir was signed to Tranmere Rovers by player-manager, Frank Worthington, who was his striking partner in his first season at the club. Despite his evident promise, he spent his early career at Rovers immersed in struggle, as the club languished in the basement of the league and Muir was part of the side that beat Exeter City 1–0 to save Rovers from automatic relegation from Division Four in 1987. He set up the crucial goal, headed in by Gary Williams in the 77th minute of the last game of that season. Muir prospered when new manager, John King, signed a big target-man, Jim Steel, as his strike partner in late 1987. Within four years, Rovers had been promoted twice and appeared at Wembley five times, with Muir scoring in the FA's centenary celebrations in 1988 and in Tranmere's Leyland DAF Trophy victory over Bristol Rovers in 1990. Injury prevented Muir partaking in the final strait of Rovers' promotion run in 1991 when they reached the second tier of English football for only the second time in their history. That summer, the signing of John Aldridge at Tranmere led to the marginalisation of Ian Muir, who remained a regular goalscorer when called upon for the remainder of his Tranmere career.
To a generation of Tranmere Rovers fans, Ian Muir is remembered as a legendary player, who played the starring role in the greatest period of the club's history and also the finest centre forward not to have played in the top tier of English football.

Honours
Individual
PFA Team of the Year: 1988–89 Fourth Division, 1989–90 Third Division

References

External links
 
 

Sing Tao SC players
1963 births
Living people
Footballers from Coventry
English footballers
Association football forwards
Queens Park Rangers F.C. players
Burnley F.C. players
Birmingham City F.C. players
Brighton & Hove Albion F.C. players
Swindon Town F.C. players
Tranmere Rovers F.C. players
Darlington F.C. players
Happy Valley AA players
Nuneaton Borough F.C. players
Stratford Town F.C. players
English Football League players
Hong Kong First Division League players
Expatriate footballers in Hong Kong
English expatriate sportspeople in Hong Kong
English expatriate footballers